Benno Leesik (17 January 1960 Haapsalu – 2006) was an Estonian military personnel (Major).

In 1996 he graduated from Tartu University in law.

From 8 June 1999 to 25 March 2006, he was the chief of Estonian Defence League.

Awards:
 Estonian Air Force Service Cross

References

1960 births
2006 deaths
Estonian military personnel
People from Haapsalu